The men's 400 metre freestyle event at the 2008 Olympic Games took place on 9–10 August at the Beijing National Aquatics Center in Beijing, China.

Reigning world champion Park Tae-Hwan made an Olympic milestone to become South Korea's first ever gold medalist in swimming. He powered past the field to an unexpected triumph in an Asian record of 3:41.86. Coming from sixth place in the final lap, China's Zhang Lin delighted the home crowd with a silver-medal effort in 3:42.44. Meanwhile, U.S. swimmer Larsen Jensen set a new American record of 3:42.78 to take the bronze.

American Peter Vanderkaay delivered a strong swim with a fourth-place effort in 3:43.11, just 0.35 of a second ahead of Tunisia's Oussama Mellouli, who established a new African record of 3:43.45. Leading the field in the first 100 metres, Australia's Grant Hackett, the silver medalist in the event from Athens, could not keep the pace over the final laps, and settled only for sixth place with a time of 3:43.84. Russian duo Yuri Prilukov (3:43.97) and Nikita Lobintsev (3:48.29) rounded out the final.

Records
Prior to this competition, the existing world and Olympic records were as follows.

Results

Heats

Final

References

External links
Official Olympic Report

Men's freestyle 0400 metre
Men's events at the 2008 Summer Olympics